Fusceulima is a genus of sea snails, marine gastropod mollusks in the family Eulimidae.

Species
Species within this genus include:
 Fusceulima asser (Bartsch, 1915)
 Fusceulima boscheineni (Engl, 1998)
 Fusceulima castanea (Laseron, 1955)
 Fusceulima coralensis Hoffman & Freiwald, 2017
 Fusceulima digitalis Hoffman & Engl, 2021
 Fusceulima flava Laseron, 1955
 Fusceulima fulva (Watson, 1897)
 Fusceulima goodingi (Warén, 1981)
 Fusceulima ignota (Thiele, 1925)
 Fusceulima ingolfiana (Bouchet & Warén, 1986)
 Fusceulima innotabilis (Turton, 1932)
 Fusceulima inusta (Hedley, 1906)
 Fusceulima jacksonensis Laseron, 1955
 Fusceulima lineata (Monterosato, 1869)
 Fusceulima lutea (Turton, 1932)
 Fusceulima mangonuica (Powell, 1940)
 Fusceulima minuta (Jeffreys, 1884)
 Fusceulima murdochi (Hedley, 1904)
 Fusceulima projectilabrum (Bouchet & Warén, 1986)
Fusceulima saturata Souza & Pimenta, 2014
 Fusceulima sordida (Watson, 1897)
 Fusceulima thalassae (Bouchet & Warén, 1986)
Fusceulima toffee Souza & Pimenta, 2014
 Fusceulima victorhensenae Hoffman & Freiwald, 2017

Species brought into synonymy
 Fusceulima major (Bouchet & Warén, 1986): synonym of Fuscapex major (Bouchet & Warén, 1986)
 Fusceulima richteri (Engl, 1998): synonym of Sticteulima richteri Engl, 1997
 Fusceulima sucina (Laseron, 1955): synonym of Fusceulima jacksonensis Laseron, 1955

References

 Warén, A. (1984). A generic revision of the family Eulimidae (Gastropoda, Prosobranchia). Journal of Molluscan Studies. suppl 13: 1-96

External links
 To World Register of Marine Species
 Laseron C. F. (1955). Revision of the New South Wales Eulimoid shells. Australian Zoologist 12 (2): 83-101 page(s): 95
  Serge GOFAS, Ángel A. LUQUE, Joan Daniel OLIVER,José TEMPLADO & Alberto SERRA (2021) - The Mollusca of Galicia Bank (NE Atlantic Ocean); European Journal of Taxonomy 785: 1–114

Eulimidae